(born 5 August 1969, in Odawara, Kanagawa) is a Japanese sports journalist and TV announcer.

Mita graduated from the Faculty of Law at the Keio University and in 1992, she joined TV Shizuoka as an announcer. She resigned in 1996 and after working in various sports media, specialised in puroresu as a member of the talent agency Furutachi Project.

Mita is a prominent figure of Fighting TV Samurai puroresu broadcasts as an announcer of the  daily programme as well as the producer and host for the weekly programme Indie no Oshigoto that focuses on the independent circuit. Indie no Oshigoto is co-hosted by the puppet character Carlos the Mexican Mole (voiced by puroresu journalist and colour commentator Hirotsugu Suyama).

Championships and accomplishments
DDT Pro-Wrestling
Ironman Heavymetalweight Championship (1 time)

References

External links

Official blog at SAMURAI TV website

Living people
1969 births
Japanese sports announcers
Japanese television producers
Professional wrestling announcers
Japanese women journalists
Keio University alumni
People from Odawara
Women television producers
Ironman Heavymetalweight Champions